Ameer Khan Beenkar was an illustrious veena player of the eighteenth century. He was also an outstanding dhrupad singer. He along with his uncle and father-in-law Bahadur Hussain Khan established the Rampur musical court during the period of Nawab Yusef Ali Khan and Nawab Kalbey Ali Khan. Ameer Khan went to Haj pilgrimage with Nawab Kalbey Ali Khan in the year 1872. Ameer Khan was also a capable portrait artist. His self-portrait was published in Musaddas Tahniyat-e-Jahsn-e-Benazeer written by Awadh poet and later Rampur courtier Meer Yar Ali Jaan Sahab. Musaddas is currently in Rampur Raza Library..Ameer Khan wrote Gulshan-e-Musarrat which is also preserved in Rampur Raza library.

Personal life

Ameer Khan was born in Banda to Omrao Khan. He was the father of celebrated vina player Wazir Khan.

See also
Sadarang
Wazir Khan (Rampur)
Tansen
Naubat Khan
Kishangarh

References

18th-century Indian musicians
Indian royalty
Mughal nobility
Indian Shia Muslims
Hindustani instrumentalists
Indian male classical musicians